The Sizang, Siyin or Taute people are primarily the descendants of Pu Thuantak, also known as Suantak in the Tedim language and by related clans, and their adopted sons and daughters. The Siyin Valley is in present-day Chin State, Myanmar, and was settled by descendants of the Pu Thuantak who moved from their original home of Ciimnuai with other Zo (Chin) people such as the Sukte, Thado, Zou, and other related tribes.

The Zo lived in Ciimnuai until their population increased, forcing them to find more fertile soil, and they dispersed throughout the mountains and valleys in and around Chin State. Due to communication difficulties and isolation, each group from Ciimnuai developed a unique dialect. The Sizang language emerged similarly to Vaiphei, Teizang, Saizang, Val, Zou, Dim, Khuangsai and Hangmi/Milhiem, and the languages are closely related. In 2019, the Sizang population was about 10,000.

Etymology
Si means "salt water", and zang is a northern side or plain; the Sizang originated north of a brine spring. Taute, as they are known in Manipur records, means "fat people".

Culture
The Sizang had a warrior tradition similar to that of the Naga people. Headhunting was widely practiced. Sizang society was patriarchal, with inheritances going to sons.

The marriage of a man and woman from the same village, known as phungkhawm, was forbidden. The eldest man in the groom's tribe would go to the bride's tribe to propose marriage, bringing a gift of modokzu for the bride's family. If the proposal was declined, he returned with the modokzu.

Male babies are named five days after birth, and female babies after three days. They are given a temporary surname to protect them from spirits. Parents choose the name; the first son is named after his paternal grandfather and the first daughter is named after her paternal grandmother.

Religion
Before their conversion to Christianity, the Sizang were animists; they worshiped nature, Doai (the devil), and Pathian (God). They also worshiped unknown spirits to avoid harm. Illnesses were believed to be caused by evil spirits. The Sizang believed that their ancestors emerged from a gourd in the village of Chin-Nwe.

History 
During the late 19th century, when the British Imperial Army tried to colonise the Chin Hills, the Sizang resisted.

Economy
The main occupation is slash-and-burn agriculture. Livestock such as cattle, gayals, goats, chickens and pigs are also raised. Some Sizang work in the public sector as civil servants.

Language
The Sizang language resembles the Tedim language and India's Meitei and Thadou languages. Sizang, which did not have a written script until British colonisation, is written in Latin script.

See also
Siyin, Myanmar
Tedim Township

References

External links
 Zaangsiseino - Siyin Youth Association
 Ni Kong Hong - Siyin Online Magazine
 US Siyin Baptist Church
 Siyin Bible
 Siyin Hymns and Praise Songs
 Sial-Lum Fort Photo Gallery

Ethnic groups in Myanmar